Hao Guohua is a Chinese goalball judge. He is a member of the current 2010-2014 Goalball Referees Committee.

At the 2008 Summer Paralympics in Beijing, Hao took the Officials' Oath for judges at the Beijing National Stadium during the Opening Ceremonies.

References 

Goalball in China
Living people
Year of birth missing (living people)